Brazil competed at the 1988 Summer Olympics in Seoul, South Korea. 160 competitors, 127 men and 33 women, took part in 106 events in 21 sports. Brazilians conquered 6 medals in Seoul, but only one gold medal.

Aurelio Miguel Fernandez became the first Brazilian judoka to win a gold medal. He defeated Marc Meiling from West Germany in men's 95 kg category.

The previous Olympic champion runner Joaquim Cruz won the silver medal in men's 800 metres.

Men's Brazil Olympic football team was silver medalist led by Romário and Bebeto. They lost the final by 2 - 1 at extra time against Soviet Union

Robson da Silva was the first Brazilian sprinter to win an Olympic medal, a bronze in the men's 200 metres.

The other two bronze medals were obtained in sailing. Together with Nelson Falcão, Torben Grael won the medal at Star class. It was Torben Grael's second olympic medal. Torben's brother Lars Grael and Clinio Freitas obtained the bronze at Tornado class.

Medalists

| width=78% align=left valign=top |

|  style="text-align:left; width:22%; vertical-align:top;"|

Competitors
The following is the list of number of competitors in the Games.

Archery

In its third Olympic archery competition, Brazil sent two men.
Men

Athletics

Men
Track & road events

Field events

Women
Track & road events

Combined events – Heptathlon

Basketball

Summary

Men's tournament

Team roster

Group play

Quarterfinals

Classification round 5–8

Classification round 5/6

Boxing

Men

Cycling

Eight cyclists, all men, represented Brazil in 1988.

Road

Track
1000m time trial

Points race

Pursuit

Diving

Women

Equestrianism

Show jumping

Fencing

Four fencers, all men, represented Brazil in 1988.

Men's foil
 Antônio Machado
 Roberto Lazzarini
 Douglas Fonseca

Men's épée
 Antônio Machado
 Douglas Fonseca
 Roberto Lazzarini

Men's team épée
 Régis Avila, Douglas Fonseca, Roberto Lazzarini, Antônio Machado

Men's sabre
 Régis Avila

Football

Men's team

Preliminary round (Group D)

Quarter-finals

Semi-finals

Gold-medal match

Team Roster
 Claudio Taffarel
 Zé Carlos
 Jorginho
 Luís Carlos Winck
 André Cruz
 João Santos Batista
 Ademir
 Mazinho
 Edmar
 Andrade
 Careca Souza
 Milton de Souza Filho
 Geovani
 Neto
 Sergio Donizete
 Bebeto
 Aloísio
 Romário

Gymnastics

Judo

Rowing

Men

Sailing

Men

Women

Open

Shooting

Men

Women

Open

Swimming

Men

Women

Synchronized swimming

Three synchronized swimmers represented Brazil in 1988.
Women

Table tennis

Tennis

Volleyball

Men's Team Competition

Preliminary round

Pool A

|}

|}

Semifinals

|}

Bronze-medal match

|}

Team Roster
Maurício Lima 
Wagner Rocha
Paulo Rose
José Montanaro Junior
Paulo da Silva
Renan dal Zotto
William Silva
Amauri Ribeiro
Antônio Carlos Gouveia
Domingos Lampariello Neto
Leonidio de Pra Filho
André Ferreira
Head coach: Paulo Freitas

Women's Team Competition

Preliminary round

Group B

|}

|}

5th–8th-place semifinals

|}

5th-place match

|}

Team Roster
Kerly Santos 
Ana Moser 
Vera Mossa 
Eliani Costa 
Ana Richa 
Dora Castanheira 
Ana Claudia Ramos 
Marcia Cunha 
Ana Lucia Barros 
Sandra Suruagy 
Fernanda Venturini 
Simone Storm 
Head coach: Jorge de Barros

Weightlifting

Men

Wrestling

References

Nations at the 1988 Summer Olympics
1988
Olympics